Dortmund Möllerbrücke station is a transportation hub to the southwest of the inner city of Dortmund, near the Kreuzviertel (district) and West Park. A Dortmund Stadtbahn underground station is located next to the station. The station is named after the nearby Möller bridge (Möllerbrücke) and is classified by Deutsche Bahn as a category 5 station. The above ground section of the station is served by Rhine-Ruhr S-Bahn line S 4 and the underground section is served by line U42 of the Dortmund Stadtbahn. It is located on the historic Ruhr line of the Rhenish Railway Company.

History 
A block post was built on the site of today's S-Bahn station as early as 1910. There has been a tram stop at Dortmund Möllerbrücke since 1925. Trains have stopped since 26 May 1963. It was originally served by battery electric multiple units of class 515. It was served by Silberling carriages hauled by class 212 locomotives from 1980. Since 3 June 1984 x-Wagen (“x-cars”, a type of push–pull train) have operated, propelled initially by class 111 locomotives and from 1995 by class 143 locomotives. In December 2011, line S4 was converted to operation by class 422 electric multiple units.

Architectural features 

The Stadtbahn station was designed by the architects Kopka and Theil and opened in 2002. The design theme of the Stadtbahn station is "bridges", using materials made of Ruhr sandstone similar to the stone used to build the nearby Möller bridge.

Rail services 

Dortmund Möllerbrücke station is served by Rhine-Ruhr S-Bahn line S 4 at 20-minute intervals.

It  is also served by line U42 of the Dortmund Stadtbahn at 10-minute intervals.

References 

Railway stations in Dortmund
S4 (Rhine-Ruhr S-Bahn)
Rhine-Ruhr S-Bahn stations
Dortmund VRR stations
Railway stations in Germany opened in 1963
1963 establishments in West Germany